Midwest Military Academy (MMA) was an elementary, middle school and high school in Wheaton, Illinois. The school was demolished in 1988 creating the Academy Highlands subdivision.

Located among 16 1/2 acres at Academy Lane and Orchard Road, the school was established in 1931. The last owner was Jerry Williams. Upon closure of the school, the Chicago area had one remaining military school, located in Aurora, IL, the Marmion Military Academy.

Tuition for the year was $4,800 at the time of closing. About a dozen Midwest students transferred to St. John`s Military Academy near Lake Geneva.

History
Jerry Williams' father, Paul Williams, a retired Colonel in the U.S. Army, founded MMA in 1931 in Homewood, Illiois. The school was moved to the north part of Wheaton in 1938 followed five years by the last campus on the south part of Wheaton, which included a Victorian home once owned by industrialist Alfred Plamondon.

References

IT`S TAPS FOR A MILITARY ACADEMY AS SUBURBIA`S BUILDERS MARCH
Midwest Military Academy
Neighborhood profile: Academy Highlands

Private high schools in Illinois
Military high schools in the United States